The Newcastle Publishing Company was a Southern California-based small trade paperback publisher founded by bookstore owner Al Saunders, active from July 1971 through October 1992, under the editorial direction of Robert Reginald and Douglas Menville, formerly the editors of the speculative fiction magazine Forgotten Fantasy. Saunders died in 1997, and Newcastle was later acquired by Career Press.

The company originally reprinted out-of-print metaphysical books that had reverted to the public domain, quickly branching out into fiction and, in 1980, original works. It continued to specialize primarily in New Age and other fringe materials, including psychic powers, fortune-telling, tarot reading, numerology, and handwriting analysis. It also published self-help books.

In fiction Newcastle is best remembered for its Newcastle Forgotten Fantasy Library, which reissued two dozen neglected classics of fantasy literature between 1973 and 1980, including works by William Morris, H. Rider Haggard, Lord Dunsany, and Leslie Barringer, among other authors. In all, Newcastle published 178 books,.

The firm was successively headquartered in Hollywood and North Hollywood; some of its offerings also specify Tarzana and Van Nuys as places of publication.

Notes

Defunct book publishing companies of the United States
Publishing companies established in 1971